Focused may refer to:

 Focused (band), a Christian hardcore band
 Focused (album), a 1999 album by Billy Cobham
 "Focused" (song), a song by Wale
 "Focused", a song by Snoop Dogg from the album I Wanna Thank Me